Drama (stylized as DRAMA) is a duo from Chicago consisting of producer Na'el Shehade and vocalist/songwriter Via Rosa (born Lluvia Rosa Vela). Often described as a blend of R&B and dance, their music spans a wide variety of genres including pop, hip hop, jazz, bossa nova, and electronic. Though currently signed to independent label Ghostly International, the band is known for their DIY approach to creating and releasing their music. Their debut album Dance Without Me was released in February 2020.

History

Origins and Formation
Before meeting in 2013, Shehade and Rosa had individual careers in the music industry. Born in Austin, Texas and raised on an Indian reservation in northern California, Rosa grew up touring with her parents who played in a reggae band. Rosa developed an interest in poetry while attending charter school, which she began combining with beats she wrote in her late teenage years. After attending a culinary school in Hollywood, Rosa moved to Chicago in 2010 to be with her grandmother who was battling cancer. There, she joined hip hop collective THEMPeople and released her own musical projects between 2010 and 2014.

Shehade, who was born and raised in Chicago, spent his teenage years DJing at clothing shops and record stores, and enjoying the city's house and electronic music scenes. He began making his own music in high school (which led to Bravo licensing his music), and although he eventually attended business school to study arts management, he ultimately began collaborating with other artists as a producer. Before forming Drama, Shehade worked on projects with Chance The Rapper (Acid Rap), Kanye West (G.O.O.D. Music's Cruel Summer compilation), Chief Keef, and Vic Mensa among others. Shehade was encouraged to start releasing his own music by artist Nicolas Jaar.

Shehade and Rosa were introduced in 2013 by vocalist Jean Deaux, who at the time was collaborating with Shehade and friends with Rosa. Originally the project was informal, but eventually solidified into a fully formed duo with Shehade producing and Rosa singing and writing.

2015–2016: Gallows EP
In September 2015, Drama released their debut single "Hopes Up". The song was one of the first they wrote, later accompanied by a video in January 2016 directed by fellow Chicago native Christopher Kostrzak. Following the release of an additional single "Forever's Gone" in May, the duo released their debut Gallows EP in November 2016. Named for gallows humor, the release reflects on painful experiences with levity. The band would later release a collection of remixes from the EP in January 2018.

2018: Lies After Love EP
After releasing its first single "Majid" in April, the duo independently released their sophomore EP Lies After Love in May 2018. The EP's title summarizes the lyrical content of its songs, which are about "affirmations and lies one tells themselves to get over a heartbreak" as Rosa explained. The band supported the release with a series of U.S. tour dates on the US West Coast and a performance at Mamby on the Beach festival in June, followed by the Middle East and Europe in the fall. Over the course of the next year, the duo released singles "Ready for Love" in October 2018, "Dead and Gone" in January 2019, and "Give No Fucks" in June 2019. The band also toured with French artist Jain in fall 2018, and completed their own 15-date North American headline tour in February 2019 including a sold-out show at the Echo in Los Angeles.

2019–Present: Ghostly International and Dance Without Me
In 2019 Drama signed with independent label Ghostly International, releasing their first single "Hold On" with the label in September followed by a tour with SG Lewis that fall.  In November, Drama announced their debut album Dance Without Me as well as their 2020 North American, UK, and European headline tour dates alongside their single release "Gimme Gimme." The band released two additional singles before the album: "Nine One One" in December, and "Years" in January 2020 with a video directed by Adam Chitayat. The latter track was named "Today's Top Tune" by LA radio station KCRW in February.

Drama released Dance Without Me on February 14, 2020 via Ghostly International. The album, hailed as a "powerful ode to heartbreak and the metamorphosis that comes from the spiritual journey to total self-love and acceptance" continues exploring the themes of love and loss that have pervaded the bands career. The band promoted the album with a series of headline U.S. tour dates, including sold-out shows in Los Angeles, San Francisco, Brooklyn, and more, though some dates were cancelled due to the COVID-19 pandemic.

In April 2020, Drama teamed up with UK electronic duo Gorgon City to release "Nobody", a single which came to fruition in the studio while Kye Gibbon was spending time in Chicago. The single was accompanied by a video shot in Chicago featuring a street dance interpretation of West Side Story as a tribute to their collaboration. In September, Drama revisited Dance Without Me by releasing a remix EP also released by Ghostly International, featuring Poolside (band), Pional, Rezident, and Moglii. They reteamed with Gorgon City for the 2021 single "You've Done Enough."

Musical Style
Drama's music has been described as "happy sad", characterized by Rosa's poignant lyrics about love and heartbreak designed for healing and catharsis, balanced out by Shehade's production featuring "throbbing synths and R&B." Rosa has cited Sade, Drake, Stevie Nicks, and Kurt Cobain among her lyrical influences, and Billie Holiday and Toni Braxton as vocal influences. Shehade, who was influenced by Chicago house scene growing up, counts Jon Brion and Pharrell among his production influences. As they describe it, the duo's writing process involves Shehade accenting emotions evoked by Rosa's lyrics, which consist of revisiting past experiences to find new perspective.

References

External links 
Official website 

American musical duos
Musical groups from Chicago